The Concordat of 1801  was an agreement between Napoleon Bonaparte and Pope Pius VII, signed on 15 July 1801 in Paris. It remained in effect until 1905, except in Alsace-Lorraine, where it remains in force. It sought national reconciliation between revolutionaries and Catholics and solidified the Roman Catholic Church as the majority church of France, with most of its civil status restored. This resolved the hostility of devout French Catholics against the revolutionary state. It did not restore the vast church lands and endowments that had been seized upon during the revolution and sold off.  Catholic clergy returned from exile, or from hiding, and resumed their traditional positions in their traditional churches.  Very few parishes continued to employ the priests who had accepted the Civil Constitution of the Clergy of the Revolutionary regime. While the Concordat restored much power to the papacy, the balance of church-state relations tilted firmly in Napoleon's favour. He selected the bishops and supervised church finances.

Napoleon and the Pope both found the Concordat useful. Similar arrangements were made with the Church in territories controlled by Napoleon, especially Italy and Germany.

History
During the French Revolution, the National Assembly had taken Church properties and issued the Civil Constitution of the Clergy, which made the Church a department of the State, effectively removing it from papal authority. At the time, the nationalized Gallican Church was the official church of France, but it was essentially Catholicism. The Civil Constitution caused hostility among the Vendeans towards the change in the relationship between the Catholic Church and the French government. Subsequent laws abolished the traditional Gregorian calendar and Christian holidays.

The Concordat was drawn up by a commission with three representatives from each party.
Napoleon Bonaparte, who was First Consul of the French Republic at the time, appointed Joseph Bonaparte, his brother, Emmanuel Crétet, a counselor of state, and Étienne-Alexandre Bernier, a doctor in theology. Pope Pius VII appointed Cardinal Ercole Consalvi, Cardinal Giuseppe Spina, archbishop of Corinth, and his theological adviser, Father Carlo Francesco Maria Caselli. The French bishops, whether still abroad or returned to their own country, had no part in the negotiations. The concordat as finally arranged practically ignored them.

While the Concordat restored some ties to the papacy, it was largely in favor of the state; it wielded greater power vis-à-vis the Pope than previous French regimes had, and church lands lost during the Revolution were not returned. Napoleon took a utilitarian approach to the role of religion. He could now win favor with French Catholics while also controlling Rome in a political sense. Napoleon once told his brother Lucien in April 1801, "Skillful conquerors have not got entangled with priests.  They can both contain them and use them." As a part of the Concordat, he presented another set of laws called the Organic Articles.

Contents
The main terms of the Concordat of 1801 between France and Pope Pius VII included:
 A declaration that "Catholicism was the religion of the great majority of the French" but not the official state religion, thus maintaining religious freedom, in particular with respect to Protestants.
 The Papacy had the right to depose bishops; the French government still, since the Concordat of Bologna in 1516, nominated them.
 The state would pay clerical salaries and the clergy swore an oath of allegiance to the state.
 The Catholic Church gave up all its claims to Church lands that were confiscated after 1790.
 Sunday was reestablished as a "festival", effective Easter Sunday, 18 April 1802. The rest of the French Republican calendar, which had been abolished, was not replaced by the traditional Gregorian Calendar until 1 January 1806.

According to Georges Goyau, the law known as "The Organic Articles", promulgated in April 1802, infringed in various ways on the spirit of the concordat. The document claimed Catholicism was "the religion of the majority of Frenchmen," and still gave state recognition to Protestants and Jews as well.

The Concordat was abrogated by the law of 1905 on the separation of Church and state. However, some provisions of the Concordat are still in effect in the Alsace-Lorraine region under the local law of Alsace-Moselle, as the region was controlled by the German Empire at the time of the 1905 law's passage.

See also
 Napoleon and the Jews
 Concordat in Alsace-Moselle

References

Further reading
 Aston, Nigel. Religion and revolution in France, 1780-1804 (Catholic University of America Press, 2000), pp. 279–315.

 Roberts, William."Napoleon, the Concordat of 1801, and Its Consequences." in: Frank J. Coppa, ed., Controversial Concordats: The Vatican's Relations with Napoleon, Mussolini, and Hitler (1999) pp: 34–80.

 
 Walsh, Henry Horace. The Concordat of 1801: A Study of the Problem of Nationalism in the Relations of Church and State (Columbia University Press, 1933).

External links
 Documents upon Napoleon and the Reorganization of Religion: selected text of the Concordat and Organic Articles

History of Catholicism in France
1801
1801 in France
Peace treaties of the French Revolutionary Wars
Religion and the French Revolution
1801 treaties
Treaties of the French First Republic
France–Holy See relations
1801 in the Papal States
July 1801 events
French Consulate
1800s in Paris